2007 West Azerbaijan clashes were a series of armed clashes between Iranian security forces and the Kurdish insurgent group PJAK in Iran's West Azerbaijan province. It started with a series of clashes between Iran and the PKK, leading to the death of 17 PKK militants between February 22 and February 24 by Iranian forces. This was followed by an Iranian helicopter crash in Khoy, an incident which was claimed to be performed by PJAK, though denied by Iranians as technical malfunction. The Iranian military launched an offensive the next day which resulted in the death of 47 insurgents and 17 security forces and lasted until March 1.

Background

Offensive
During February 22-24, the IRGC forces have been clashing with Turkey's outlawed Kurdistan Workers' Party (PKK), in which at least 17 PKK members were killed in West Azerbaijan province.

On February 24, 2007, an Iranian helicopter crashed near the town of Khoy, killing 8 IRGC soldiers, including several members of the Revolutionary Guards, one of them being Said Qahari, the head of the Iranian army's 3rd Corps. PJAK quickly claimed to have shot down the helicopter using a shoulder-launched missile, killing 20 soldiers, including several senior officers, during an hour-long battle. Iran, however, blamed the crash on bad weather.

On February 25, 2007, Iran launched a counter-offensive against the PJAK group in the northeast of Iran's West Azerbaijan province, near the Turkish border. According to Iran's state news agencies, as many as 47 Kurdish rebels and 17 Iranian soldiers were killed in the violence between February 25 and March 1, 2007.

Aftermath
In August 2007, PJAK claimed it managed to down another Iranian military helicopter that was conducting a forward operation of bombardment by Iranian forces. In this crash 5 IRGC soldiers were injured. Iran claimed the crash was resulted due to bad weather in the region.

See also
 Iranian Kurdistan

References

2007 in Iran
Battles involving Iran
Conflicts in 2007
West Azerbaijan offensive